Rokunovo is a rural locality (a village) in Zelentsovskoye Rural Settlement, Nikolsky District, Vologda Oblast, Russia. The population was 133 as of 2002.

Geography 
Rokunovo is located 63 km northwest of Nikolsk (the district's administrative centre) by road. Sinitsyno is the nearest rural locality.

References 

Rural localities in Nikolsky District, Vologda Oblast